An appeal to the law (argumentum ad legem in Latin) is a fallacy in which someone tries to encourage or defend an action purely because it is legal, or tries to condemn an action as morally reprehensible, purely because it is illegal. This line of reasoning is faulty because although the law of the land is important, it does not necessarily match up with the morality or sensibility of an action.

Examples 

 "In some states, it is illegal to feed the homeless. Thus, feeding the homeless is immoral."
 "So what if I cheated on my husband? It's not like being unfaithful is a crime!"
 "There's nothing illegal about hoarding toilet paper during a pandemic, therefore it is a good idea."

See also 

 Appeal to consequences
 Argument from authority
 Legal threat
 Circular reasoning

References 

Relevance fallacies
Fallacies
Informal fallacies